LaGrande Dam (or La Grande Dam) is a hydroelectric dam on the Nisqually River, on the border of Pierce County and Thurston County, Washington.  LaGrande is the lesser of two coordinated dams on the Nisqually, situated two miles north (downstream) of the other, Alder Dam.  Both are owned by Tacoma Power.

Hydroelectric power was first produced from LaGrande in November 1912 as the first independent project of Tacoma Power. The present structure was completed in 1945, the same year as Alder Dam's construction.

Neither LaGrande Dam nor its narrow two-mile-long impoundment "LaGrande Reservoir" is accessible to the public.

References

External links 

Dams in Washington (state)
United States power company dams
Hydroelectric power plants in Washington (state)
Buildings and structures in Pierce County, Washington
Buildings and structures in Thurston County, Washington
Dams completed in 1945
Energy infrastructure completed in 1912
1912 establishments in Washington (state)
Tacoma Public Utilities